Allenhurst is a city in Liberty County, Georgia, United States. It is a part of the Hinesville-Fort Stewart metropolitan statistical area. As of the 2020 census, the city had a population of 816.

History
Allenhurst was platted in 1910 by B. H. Allen, the proprietor of a local sawmill. A post office has been in operation since 1909.

Geography
Allenhurst is located at  (31.781311, -81.608470).

Demographics

As of the 2010 United States Census, there were 695 people living in the city. The racial makeup of the city was 45.2% White, 43.0% Black, 2.3% Asian, 1.0% Pacific Islander and 2.7% from two or more races. 5.8% were Hispanic or Latino of any race.

As of the census of 2000, there were 788 people, 281 households, and 202 families living in the town. The racial makeup of the town was 49.87% White, 44.16% African American, 0.51% Native American, 0.63% Asian, 0.25% Pacific Islander, 1.27% from other races, and 3.30% from two or more races. Hispanic or Latino of any race were 5.20% of the population.

There were 281 households, out of which 43.4% had children under the age of 18 living with them, 53.0% were married couples living together, 14.9% had a female householder with no husband present, and 28.1% were non-families. 18.1% of all households were made up of individuals, and 3.2% had someone living alone who was 65 years of age or older.  The average household size was 2.80 and the average family size was 3.12.

In the town, the population was spread out, with 31.6% under the age of 18, 14.8% from 18 to 24, 33.2% from 25 to 44, 14.1% from 45 to 64, and 6.2% who were 65 years of age or older.  The median age was 27 years. For every 100 females, there were 105.7 males.  For every 100 females age 18 and over, there were 106.5 males.

The median income for a household in the town was $38,750, and the median income for a family was $40,536. Males had a median income of $25,972 versus $19,688 for females. The per capita income for the town was $14,501.  About 12.2% of families and 12.5% of the population were below the poverty line, including 15.8% of those under age 18 and none of those age 65 or over.

Government and infrastructure

The United States Postal Service operates the Allenhurst Post Office. The current Mayor of Allenhurst is James Willis.

Education
The Liberty County School District operates public schools that serve Allenhurst.

References

Cities in Liberty County, Georgia
Cities in Georgia (U.S. state)
Hinesville metropolitan area